Kamrul Laila Jolly is Bangladesh Awami League politician and Member of Parliament representing Magura District.

Biography
Kamrul Laila Jolly was born on 30 October in 1964. She was elected to Parliament from seat 10 of the reserved seats for women in 2014 for the 10th parliamentary session. She was elected unopposed with 47 other female Members of parliament on 19 March 2014. She represents the Magura District in Khulna Division. She is a Member of the Parliamentary Standing Committee on the Ministry of Liberation War Affairs. The committee investigated the Minister of Liberation War Affairs AKM Mozammel Haque in 2015, after the ministry allegedly awarded low quality gold crests to foreign friends of Bangladesh Liberation war. On 8 March 2015 she was one of the government representatives present at the triennial council of Magura district unit of Bangladesh Awami League where they spoke against the opposition party, Bangladesh Nationalist Party. They alleged Bangladesh Nationalist Party was trying to turn Bangladesh into a failed state.

References

Awami League politicians
Living people
Women members of the Jatiya Sangsad
People from Magura District
1964 births
10th Jatiya Sangsad members
21st-century Bangladeshi women politicians